Orkesumet is a town and a ward in the Manyara Region of Tanzania. It is the district headquarter of Simanjiro District. 

According to the 2012 census, the population of Orkesumet is 5,325.

In 2014, plans were announced to build the Simanjiro District Hospital in Orkesumet.

References

Populated places in Manyara Region
Wards of Manyara Region